Everything in Between is the third album released by the American singer-songwriter Matt Wertz. It his first on the major label Nettwerk.

The track "Over You" is featured in a 2006 episode of Laguna Beach.

Track listing
 "The Way I Feel" - 03:20
 "Carolina" - 03:02
 "Heartbreaker" - 02:43
 "Over You" - 03:13
 "5:19" - 03:10
 "I Will Not Take My Love Away" - 02:23
 "Like the Last Time" - 03:02
 "With You, Tonight" - 04:07
 "Naturally" - 03:28
 "Capitol City" - 05:19

References 

2006 albums
Matt Wertz albums
Aware Records albums